The Platißbach is a roughly , southern and orographically right-hand tributary of the River Olef in the municipality of Hellenthal in Germany.

Course 
The Platißbach rises in the High Fens-Eifel Nature Park in the North Eifel natural region of the Hollerath Plateau.

The Platißbach initially flows in a northern direction. After about  it collects an unnamed stream from the left and changes direction to head east. On reaching the B 265 it changes course again and flows parallel to the road in a northwesterly direction to its mouth. On its way it flows through the Platißbach Valley Nature Reserve. 
In Hellenthal it empties into the Urft tributary, the Olef, at about 403 m.

Catchment and tributaries 

See also
List of rivers of North Rhine-Westphalia

References 

Rivers of North Rhine-Westphalia
Rivers of the Eifel
Euskirchen (district)
Rivers of Germany